The 1902 South Monaghan by-election was held on 4 March 1902 after resignation of the incumbent MP James Daly of the Irish Parliamentary Party. The IPP's candidate John McKean was unopposed and so was returned as the MP.

References

Unopposed by-elections to the Parliament of the United Kingdom in Irish constituencies
1902 elections in the United Kingdom
March 1902 events
By-elections to the Parliament of the United Kingdom in County Monaghan constituencies
1902 elections in Ireland